The Lockport Locks were a minor league baseball team based in Lockport, New York. The team began in 1942 as the Lockport White Sox, and affiliate of the Chicago White Sox in the Pennsylvania–Ontario–New York League, which is today the New York–Penn League. In 1943 the team changed affiliations with the Chicago-based major league clubs and became the Lockport Cubs. After spending 1945 as the Lockport White Socks, they were the Cubs again in 1946, however as an unaffiliated team. The team became affiliated with the Cincinnati Reds in 1947 and were renamed the Lockport Reds. A year later the club won the league title.

In 1951 the Reds joined the Middle Atlantic League, and were renamed the Lockport Locks. The team disbanded with league after the 1951 season.

Notable alumni

 Smoky Burgess (1944) 9 x MLB All-Star

 Jim Delsing (1942)

Year-by-year record

Baseball teams established in 1942
Baseball teams disestablished in 1951
Defunct minor league baseball teams
Chicago Cubs minor league affiliates
Chicago White Sox minor league affiliates
Cincinnati Reds minor league affiliates
1942 establishments in New York (state)
1951 disestablishments in New York (state)
Niagara County, New York
Defunct baseball teams in New York (state)
Middle Atlantic League teams